The United States'	Zina Garrison and Pam Shriver defeated Czechoslovakia's Jana Novotná and Helena Suková in the final, 4–6, 6–2, 10–8 to win the gold medal in Women's Doubles tennis at the 1988 Summer Olympics. Australia's Elizabeth Smylie and Wendy Turnbull and West Germany's Steffi Graf and Claudia Kohde-Kilsch won the bronze medals.

The tournament was held at the Seoul Olympic Park Tennis Center in Seoul, South Korea. Tennis was officially re-introduced as an official sport in the 1988 Summer Olympics, after being held as a demonstration sport in the 1968 Summer Olympics and 1984 Summer Olympics. It was discontinued from being an official sport after the 1924 Summer Olympics before its re-introduction. There were 28 competitors (14 teams) from 14 countries.

Medalists

Seeds
The top two seeded teams received byes into the quarterfinals.

Draw

References
 ITF 1988 Summer Olympics Women's Doubles Draw

1988
Women's Doubles
Olympics Doubles
Tennis Doubles